Anthony or Tony Bond may refer to:

Sports
Tony Bond (footballer, born 1888), English footballer
Tony Bond (footballer, born 1913) (1913–1991), English footballer
Tony Bond (rugby union) (born 1953), English rugby union player

Fictional characters
Anthony Bond, character in Afraid of Love (film) 
Tony Bond, character in Afraid of Love (film)